Sergio Lorenzo Torrens (born 29 January 1990) is a South African professional rugby union player who last played for the  in the Currie Cup and the Rugby Challenge. He is a utility back that can play as a winger, centre or fullback.

Rugby career

Youth and amateur rugby

Torrens was born in Bellville South in Cape Town. He was selected to represent 's Under-18 at the 2008 Academy Week tournament and also made six starts on the left wing for their Under-19 team in the 2009 Under-19 Provincial Championship, scoring a try in their victory over the s.

He dropped out of provincial rugby for a number of years, but appeared in nationwide amateur competitions on two occasions – in 2011, Torrens was a member of the  squad that participated in the inaugural Varsity Shield competition, while in 2013, he played for Durban-based College Rovers in the SARU Community Cup. He started in each of his team's matches in the latter competition, scoring tries against Despatch, Sishen (two tries) and Walmers in Pool A of the initial round of the competition to help his side qualify for the finals tournament, and he also scored against Durbanville-Bellville in the quarter finals, Brakpan in the semi-finals and Despatch in the final, falling just short by losing 24–26 to the team from the Eastern Cape.

Leopards

His Currie Cup debut followed a couple of months later as the Leopards attempted to qualify for the 2014 Currie Cup Premier Division through a qualification series; he came on as a replacement in their 51–23 victory over the  before starting at outside centre in their 45–22 victory over the  a week later. The Leopards finished top of the log to qualify for a home semi-final against the same opposition, but the team from Kempton Park sprung a surprise by winning the match 31–24, with Torrens coming on for the final twenty minutes of the match.

He took his try-scoring form into the Currie Cup qualification series, scoring in their 45–17 victory in their opening match. That turned out to be his final match for the Leopards as injury ruled him out for the remainder of the season.

Boland Cavaliers

After the 2015 season, Torrens moved back to his native Western Cape to join Wellington-based side . He made the right-wing position his own, starting thirteen of Boland's fourteen matches in the 2016 Currie Cup qualification series in that position.

References

South African rugby union players
Living people
1990 births
Rugby union players from Cape Town
Rugby union centres
Rugby union wings
Rugby union fullbacks
Boland Cavaliers players
Leopards (rugby union) players